The Purple Mask is a 1955 American swashbuckler film directed by H. Bruce Humberstone starring Tony Curtis and set in 1803 France.

Background 
The film was based on a successful play of the same name. The original 1913 French play titled Le Chevalier au masque, by Paul Armont and Jean Manoussi, was adapted into English as The Purple Mask by Matheson Lang. The play opened in London in 1918 and ran for 365 performances. A later production in New York in 1920, starring Leo Ditrichstein, was less successful, closing after 139 shows.

Plot
France, 1803, is under Napoleon Bonaparte's rule, but royalist adversaries rally behind the mysterious Purple Mask, whose daring feats give them hope. A police captain, Rochet, goes after the Purple Mask only to be taken captive by him, whereupon Napoleon assigns the expert swordsman Brisquet to go after him.

The lovely Laurette de Latour, daughter of a duke and romantic interest of Captain Laverne, is on the side of the royalists. She helps hatch a scheme in which the foppish Rene de Traviere, who seems able with a sword, impersonates the Purple Mask to infiltrate Napoleon's ranks and free her kidnapped father.

Laurette is unaware that Rene is, in fact, the Purple Mask, who continues his charade, drawing ridicule on himself, until ultimately he is imprisoned along with the duke. Laurette discovers his true identity while imprisoned.

On their way to the guillotine, Rene, Laurette and the duke are rescued in a pre-arranged raid through the sewers of Paris by the royalist rebels. Napoleon, glad to be rid of the troublemakers, permits Rene and Laurette to leave the country for England.

Cast
 Tony Curtis as Rene de Traviere / The Purple Mask
 Colleen Miller as Laurette de Latour 
 Angela Lansbury as Madame Valentine 
 Gene Barry as Capt. Charles Laverne
 Allison Hayes as Irene de Bournotte
 John Hoyt as Rochet
 Dan O'Herlihy as Brisquet
 Robert Cornthwaite as Napoleon
 Paul Cavanagh as Duc de Latour

See also
 List of American films of 1955

 List of adventure films of the 1950s
 List of American films of 1955
 List of Universal Pictures films

References

External links
 
 
 

1950s historical adventure films
1955 films
CinemaScope films
American historical adventure films
Depictions of Napoleon on film
American films based on plays
Films set in France
Films set in the 1800s
American swashbuckler films
Universal Pictures films
Films directed by H. Bruce Humberstone
1950s English-language films
1950s American films